Glenn Manton (born 1 June 1973) is a former Australian rules footballer who played for Carlton and Essendon. Since leaving the AFL, he has been an author, media personality, youth advocate and professional speaker.

AFL career
Manton played for both Strathmore and East Keilor before joining the Essendon Under-19s as a 16-year-old. He made his AFL debut in 1992 at age 18 for the Bombers and played 21 games over three seasons for them. He was delisted by Essendon after the 1994 season, then recruited by Carlton in the 1995 Pre-season draft. He played 12 games for the club during the 1995 season, mostly off the interchange bench, and was part of the club's 1995 Premiership Team, the only AFL premiership of his career.

Over the following seasons, Manton cemented his position in the Carlton team, playing primarily as a strong-spoiling defender, occasionally playing in the forward line. He was a regular selection in the team from 1996 until 2001, and played in the 1999 Grand Final when Carlton lost to North Melbourne.

Manton was delisted at the end of the 2003 season, after only five senior appearances that year. At the end of his career he had appeared 157 times for Carlton and 178 times overall. He played in a total of three pre-season premierships for Carlton and Essendon, a Reserve Grade Premiership for Essendon and by the conclusion of his career he was inducted into the AFL's 200 Club.

Statistics

|-
|- style="background-color: #EAEAEA"
! scope="row" style="text-align:center" | 1992
|style="text-align:center;"|
| 53 || 2 || 0 || 0 || 9 || 6 || 15 || 7 || 0 || 0.0 || 0.0 || 4.5 || 3.0 || 7.5 || 3.5 || 0.0 || 0
|-
! scope="row" style="text-align:center" | 1993
|style="text-align:center;"|
| 37 || 7 || 0 || 0 || 28 || 30 || 58 || 19 || 3 || 0.0 || 0.0 || 4.0 || 4.3 || 8.3 || 2.7 || 0.4 || 0
|- style="background-color: #EAEAEA"
! scope="row" style="text-align:center" | 1994
|style="text-align:center;"|
| 25 || 12 || 4 || 4 || 64 || 59 || 123 || 50 || 7 || 0.3 || 0.3 || 5.3 || 4.9 || 10.3 || 4.2 || 0.6 || 0
|-
|style="text-align:center;background:#afe6ba;"|1995†
|style="text-align:center;"|
| 22 || 12 || 2 || 2 || 28 || 46 || 74 || 14 || 11 || 0.2 || 0.2 || 2.3 || 3.8 || 6.2 || 1.2 || 0.9 || 0
|- style="background-color: #EAEAEA"
! scope="row" style="text-align:center" | 1996
|style="text-align:center;"|
| 22 || 24 || 7 || 4 || 194 || 141 || 335 || 150 || 45 || 0.3 || 0.2 || 8.1 || 5.9 || 14.0 || 6.3 || 1.9 || 4
|-
! scope="row" style="text-align:center" | 1997
|style="text-align:center;"|
| 22 || 20 || 10 || 7 || 118 || 104 || 222 || 96 || 23 || 0.5 || 0.4 || 5.9 || 5.2 || 11.1 || 4.8 || 1.2 || 2
|- style="background-color: #EAEAEA"
! scope="row" style="text-align:center" | 1998
|style="text-align:center;"|
| 22 || 20 || 9 || 0 || 99 || 140 || 239 || 113 || 27 || 0.5 || 0.0 || 5.0 || 7.0 || 12.0 || 5.7 || 1.4 || 1
|-
! scope="row" style="text-align:center" | 1999
|style="text-align:center;"|
| 22 || 26 || 2 || 6 || 105 || 189 || 294 || 116 || 24 || 0.1 || 0.2 || 4.0 || 7.3 || 11.3 || 4.5 || 0.9 || 0
|- style="background-color: #EAEAEA"
! scope="row" style="text-align:center" | 2000
|style="text-align:center;"|
| 22 || 17 || 0 || 0 || 46 || 60 || 106 || 36 || 20 || 0.0 || 0.0 || 2.7 || 3.5 || 6.2 || 2.1 || 1.2 || 0
|-
! scope="row" style="text-align:center" | 2001
|style="text-align:center;"|
| 22 || 24 || 0 || 0 || 102 || 89 || 191 || 88 || 19 || 0.0 || 0.0 || 4.3 || 3.7 || 8.0 || 3.7 || 0.8 || 0
|- style="background-color: #EAEAEA"
! scope="row" style="text-align:center" | 2002
|style="text-align:center;"|
| 22 || 9 || 0 || 0 || 21 || 33 || 54 || 17 || 7 || 0.0 || 0.0 || 2.3 || 3.7 || 6.0 || 1.9 || 0.8 || 0
|-
! scope="row" style="text-align:center" | 2003
|style="text-align:center;"|
| 22 || 5 || 0 || 0 || 18 || 17 || 35 || 15 || 3 || 0.0 || 0.0 || 3.6 || 3.4 || 7.0 || 3.0 || 0.6 || 0
|- class="sortbottom"
! colspan=3| Career
! 178
! 34
! 23
! 832
! 914
! 1746
! 721
! 189
! 0.2
! 0.1
! 4.7
! 5.1
! 9.8
! 4.1
! 1.1
! 7
|}

Post-AFL
Following his AFL career, Manton attempted a transition to soccer with South Melbourne Hellas, trying out as goalkeeper. He then spent the next couple of years competing in the four-man bobsleigh, training throughout 2004 and then racing on the World Cup circuit as part of the Australian team in 2005 and 2006. He has since returned to playing Australian rules football periodically at a local level.

Throughout his playing time, he was a regular panellist on Nine Network's The Footy Show, where he developed a reputation for his larrikinism and comedic ability. After his retirement, he performed at Melbourne International Comedy Festivals, was a regular on Vega 91.5, community radio station 3RRR, Fox Football programs and wrote a regular column for MX. He is a former board member of Melbourne Fringe, and later performed in the 2016 Melbourne Fringe Festival.

In 1999, after completing a degree in education, Manton co-founded Whitelion, a not-for-profit organisation assisting youth in crisis within the juvenile justice system. As a motivational speaker, he addresses a wide range of audiences, and also works with Red Dust, a not-for-profit group which helps Indigenous communities. His motivation to work in the field stemmed in part from his own experiences of being mentored as a troubled youth: at the age of 17, he nearly lost the use of his arm after breaking a thick glass window with it (he wore an arm-guard throughout his football career due to the injury), before the personal counselling he received from former Essendon player Alec Epis helped him to transform his outlook on life.

He is the author of several books, including Dead Bolt, Praying Manton, Mongrel Punts and Hard Ball Gets, Tattoo Urself, I was Verka Serduchka, Authentic, Call that a Bovril? and Put Your Damn Phone Down.

Publications
 Dead Bolt: Sightings from the Outer, Wilkinson Publishing, 2004, 
 Mongrel Punts and Hard Ball Gets, an A-Z of Footy Speak, with Paula Hunt, Red Dog Books, 2012, 
 Tattoo Urself: Line, Colour, Shade, Glenn Manton, 2015, 
 Authentic, Glenn Manton, 2015, 
 Put Your Damn Phone Down, Brio Books, 2018,

References

External links
Blueseum Profile
 https://web.archive.org/web/20110216153333/http://www.glennmanton.com.au/index.php?sectionID=4009&pageID=4019

1973 births
Living people
Carlton Football Club players
Carlton Football Club Premiership players
Essendon Football Club players
Preston Football Club (VFA) players
Australian male bobsledders
Australian rules footballers from Victoria (Australia)
Strathmore Football Club players
One-time VFL/AFL Premiership players
Australian television personalities
21st-century Australian male writers
Australian indigenous rights activists